The 2013 British National Track Championships were a series of track cycling competitions held from 25 to 29 September 2013, at the Manchester Velodrome. They were organised and sanctioned by British Cycling, and were open to British cyclists.

Competition
Separate competitions were held for both men and women, and certain events were also included for paracyclists and juniors. No events were held in Women's Omnium or Men's Madison; otherwise the men's and women's programme was broadly identical, and matched the programme of the UCI World Track Cycling Championships, with the addition of a women's madison race. The women's team pursuit was held over 4000m for four cyclists for the first time following modifications to the event.

Open to British cyclists, the winners of each event are entitled to wear the national champion's jersey - a white jersey with a red, white and blue front stripe - for the next year when competing in that discipline.

The 2013 event was dominated by established Olympic cyclists, the most successful of which was Double Olympic champion Laura Trott, winning four titles (two in team events) and a silver medal; only a surprise win in the scratch race for Corrine Hall prevented a clean sweep of 5 endurance titles. Jessica Varnish did complete a sprint sweep of 4 titles, including the team sprint with Dannielle Khan. Trott, with Danielle King, Joanna Rowsell and Elinor Barker also set a new world record on the way to achieving the gold medal in the recently revised women's team pursuit. The previous world record, over a shorter distance and for three riders, is also held by Trott, Rowsell and King.

The medals were more evenly distributed among the men, as several endurance events went uncontested by established talent, and so provided opportunities for up and coming riders. Jason Kenny won three, and Kian Emadi won two, of the sprint disciplines, while Matthew Crampton won a medal in all four, including gold in the team sprint with Emadi and Kenny.

Also noteworthy was the unusual double almost achieved by Ed Clancy, winning gold in the individual pursuit, and silver in the Kilo, normally considered a time trial for sprint athletes only. Clancy also won gold in the points race and silver in the scratch, but did not contest the team pursuit, in which discipline he was reigning Olympic champion. Other noteworthy performances included several medal rides in sprint disciplines by converted heptathlete Katy Marchant in her first major event. Although double World champion Becky James did not compete, her sister Rachel did attend, winning a pair of medals.

Medal summary

Men's Events

Women's Events

 in bronze medal final ride off
WR = World REcord; EUR = European Record

Para-cycling Events
A series of para-cycling national championships were also held over combined categories using a points system. Tandem events were held for blind and visually impaired cyclists which other categories were put together in weighted mixed events.

AT = Actual Time
TT = Target or reference time

Under 16 Madison Events
The British Under 16 Madison championships were also held as part of the competition.

References

British National Track Championships
British National Track Championships